Ian James Westwood (born 13 July 1982) is a former English cricketer who played for Warwickshire County Cricket Club. He retired from cricket in June 2017.

Career
Westwood made his senior debut for Warwickshire in a friendly List A match in 2001. It wasn't until 2003 until he made his first-class debut. For the next two seasons he was in and out of the side but cemented his place at the end of the 2005 season with some consistent performances. The 2006 season brought Westwood his maiden first-class 100.

In November 2008, Westwood was appointed Warwickshire captain in succession to Darren Maddy.

On 27 June 2017 Westwood announced his retirement from cricket.

References

External links

1982 births
Living people
English cricketers
Warwickshire cricketers
Warwickshire Cricket Board cricketers
Warwickshire cricket captains